

Koyah

Introduction 
Koyah, also Xo'ya, Coya, Coyour, Kower, Kouyer (Haida: Xhuuyaa - "Raven" ( 1787–1795), was the chief of Ninstints or Skungwai, the main village of the Kunghit-Haida during the era of the Maritime Fur Trade in Haida Gwaii off the North Coast of British Columbia, Canada. Chief, which means the head of a body of persons or an organization. Koyah was involved in more conflicts with ship captains than any other chief of his period and figures prominently in histories of the fur trade and coastal exploration.

Chief Koyah (Xo'ya) was a prominent Indigenous leader among the Kunghit-Haidas, who were a division of the Haida people living on the Queen Charlotte Islands (now known as Haida Gwaii) off the coast of present-day British Columbia, Canada.

In the late 18th century, when the Haida people were among the most prosperous traders of sea otter pelts, which were highly sought by European and American traders, Chief Koyah had a considerable impact on the fur trade. Koyah had a reputation for being a cunning negotiator and for being able to form relationships with both European traders and other Native American chiefs.

The Haida people, meanwhile, were significantly impacted by the fur trade because it created rivalry and hostility between various Indigenous tribes and allowed diseases to spread, which decimated Indigenous populations. According to legend, smallpox claimed the life of Chief Koyah in June 1795.

References

Further reading
 

Haida people
Fur trade
Indigenous leaders in British Columbia
Pre-Confederation British Columbia people
Year of birth unknown
18th-century indigenous people of the Americas

The Haida 
The haida, always infers to the people who lived in near island. And they were called Tlingit and Tsimshian peoples. Haida society included ranks of noble, commoner and slave.There were two major clans. Those clans were defined into lineages. Moreover, the Haida were talented as weavers, sailors, and woodworkers. So there were famous as "the Vikings of North America". Koyah was involed in many clashes with trading vessels than any other northwest coast chief, and his life had connections with violence that often marred the Pacific fur trade. However, they were experiencing a cultural resurgence.

The Fur Trade 
Koyah and his people, according to historical documents, participated heavily in the fur trade with European traders, especially with the British and the Spanish. The Haida people have a long history of trading with foreigners for products and resources that are not found on their own islands, including the Kunghit-Haida of which Koyah was a leader.

The Haida people were well-known for their prowess in hunting and processing sea otter pelts, which were highly prized by traders and played a significant role in the fur trade that characterized the economy of the North American Pacific Northwest. Koyah and his tribe probably took part in this trade, exchanging pelts for items like weapons, metal tools, and cloth.

The introduction of diseases and the disruption of conventional economic and social institutions were two important effects of the fur trade on Indigenous people in the area. Significant cultural and environmental changes brought about by European traders and settlers also had a lasting effect on Indigenous populations in the area, especially the Kunghit-Haida.

Koyah sought retribution from Kendrick for how he had treated him during their prior encounter, which had diminished his standing and power among his people.

On June 16, 1791, when Kendrick went back to the town, Koyah and his supporters took advantage of the chance to board the ship and take the crew by force. According to reports, the Haida tribe took control of the ship. Koyah even boasted to Kendrick, pointing to his leg and daring him to put him in the gun carriage.

But, after a brief altercation between Koyah and Kendrick, Koyah and his supporters were ultimately forced overboard, losing roughly 40 people in the process, including Koyah's wife and two children. In addition to Koyah's own injury, the battle's outcome, personal injury, and loss contributed

Second Encounter 
Gray was informed by the Haida people that Koyah had lost his status as head chief and was now regarded as a "Ahliko," or a member of the lower class, in Haida society. Moreover, there was no longer a single head chief; rather, a number of subpar chiefs had taken their place.

Koyah's lowered status was probably due to his inability to defend his people from the incursion of European traders as well as the reputational damage he endured during his earlier meeting with Kendrick. His people may have looked to other leaders who could better protect them and advance their interests as a result of his incapacity to keep his position as head chief.

End of Koyah's dynasty 
The Kunghit-Haida people sustained additional losses in the years that followed because Koyah's kingdom did not last over the long term. The Eagle chief Ninstints eventually gained power, and it's conceivable that Koyah's diminished status and decline in reputation contributed to this change in the balance of power.

However, the Kunghit-Haida people's interactions with European traders and the 1862 smallpox outbreak probably had a terrible effect on them, further reducing their group and resources. Because of this, the last members of the tribe eventually left their town and relocated to Skidegate in British Columbia around 1885.

It's critical to acknowledge the long-lasting repercussions of colonialism and the ways in which these historical events continue to have an impact on Indigenous communities. The interactions with European traders and settlers may have allowed the Kunghit-Haida people to survive in some form, but they also permanently altered their culture and way of life.